Grotesquerie is a literary form that became a popular genre in the early 20th century. It can be grouped with science fiction and horror. Authors such as Ambrose Bierce, Fritz Leiber, H.P. Lovecraft, H. Russell Wakefield, Seabury Quinn, Mary Elizabeth Counselman, Margaret St. Clair, Stanton A. Coblentz, Lee Brown Coye and Katherine Anne Porter have written books within this genre.

The term has also been used to describe macabre artwork and movies, and it is used in architecture.

See also
 Gothic novel

References

Science fiction genres
Horror genres